This is a list of cities and towns (and former towns) and villages in Pembrokeshire, Wales.

Most places in blue have their own article; those in red do not. Some (annotated (r)) are currently redirected to their parent parish (for which see GENUKI) or community (see list at the foot of this page) and may be sufficiently notable for their own article. Coordinates can usually be found in List of United Kingdom locations.

GENUKI also has a list of Pembrokeshire place names extracted from Lewis's 1833-44 A Topographical Dictionary of Wales, which link to further sources and historical information.

Some are stub articles that need expanding; for a list, see :Category:Pembrokeshire geography stubs.

For other principal areas in Wales, see List of places in Wales.

A
Abercych, Abereiddy, Abercastle, Albert Town(r), Ambleston, Amroth, Angle, Axton Hill(r)

B
Bateman's Hill(r), Bayvil, Begelly, Bentlass, Bethlehem(r), Blackpool, Blaenffos, Boncath, Bosherston, Boulston, Brawdy, Bridell, Brimaston(r), Brithdir Mawr, Broadfield, Broad Haven, Broadmoor(r), Broadway(r), Broom(r), Brynberian, Brynhenllan, Burton, Bwlchygroes

C
Caerfarchell, Caldey Island, Camp Hill, Camrose, Canaston Bridge, Capel Colman, Carew, Carew Cheriton, Carew Newton(r), Carnhedryn, Carreg-wen, Castellan, Castlebythe, Castlemartin, Castlemorris, Churchton, Cilgerran, Cilgwyn(r), Cilrhedyn, Clarbeston, Clarbeston Road(r), Clunderwen, Clydau, Coedcanlas, Cold Blow,  Cold Inn, Cosheston, Coxlake(r), Cresselly(r), Cresswell Quay(r), Crinow, Croes-goch, Cross Hands(r), Crosswell, Crymych, Crundale, Crunwere, Cuffern(r), Cwmcych, Cwm yr Eglwys, Cippyn(r)

D
Dale, Dinas Cross, Dreenhill(r), Druidston(r)

E
East Williamston, Eglwyswen, Eglwyswrw

F
Fachelich, Felindre Farchog, Fishguard, Flimston(r), Ford(r), Foxhall, Freystrop, Freshwater East, Freshwater West

G
Gelli, Glandwr, Glanrhyd(r), Glogue, Goodwick, Granston, Greenway, Gumfreston, Gwastad(r)

H
Hakin, Haroldston St. Issell's, Haroldston West, Hasguard, Haverfordwest, Hayscastle, Hazelbeach(r), Henry's Moat, Herbrandston, Hermon, Hill Mountain, Hodgeston, Hook, Houghton, Hubberston, Hundleton

J
Jameston, Jeffreyston, Johnston, Jordanston (Llanstadwell Community)(r), Jordanston (parish)

K
Keeston(r), Kilgetty, Kingheriot

L
Lambston(r), Lammas Ecovillage, Lampeter Velfrey, Lamphey, Lawrenny, Leonardston, Letterston, Liddeston, Little Haven, Little Hasguard(r), Little Honeyborough(r), Little Newcastle, Little Milford, Llanddewi Velfrey, Llandeilo Llwydarth, Llandeloy, Llandissilio, Llandruidion, Llanfair-Nant-Gwyn, Llanfair-Nant-y-Gôf, Llanfihangel Penbedw, Llanfyrnach,  Llangloffan(r), Llangolman, Llangwm, Llanhowell(r), Llanion, Llanllawer, Llanreath, Llanreithan, Llanrhian, Llanstadwell, Llanstinan, Llanteg, Llantood, Llanungar,  Llanwnda, Llanycefn(r), Llanychaer, Llanychlwydog, Llawhaden, Llys y Fran, Loveston(r), Ludchurch, Lydstep(r), Lydstep Haven

M
Maenclochog, Maiden Wells, Manorbier, Manorbier Newton, Manordeifi, Manorowen, Marloes, Martletwy, Mascle Bridge(r), Mathry, Meline, Merlin's Bridge, Middle Mill, Milford Haven, Millin Cross, Milton(r), Minwear, Molleston,  Monington, Monkton, Morvil, Mounton, Moylgrove, Mynachlog-ddu

N
Narberth, Nash, Newchapel, Nevern, New Hedges, New Moat, Newgale, Newport, Newton North(r), Newton Mountain, Neyland, Nine Wells, Nolton(r), Nolton Haven

P
 Panteg, Paran, Pembroke, Pembroke Dock, Pembroke Ferry, Penally, Penffordd, Pennar, Penparc, Penrydd, Pentlepoir, Pentre Galar, Pen-y-Bryn(r), Penycwm, Penygroes, Pleasant Valley, Pontfaen, Pontrhydyceirt, Pontyglasier, Port Lion, Porthclais, Portheiddy, Porthgain, Poyston Cross(r), Prendergast, Puncheston, Pwllcrochan, Pwllgwaelod

R
Ramsey Island, Redberth, Reynalton, Rhoscrowther, Rhoshill, Rhosson, Rhosycaerau, Robeston Wathen, Robeston West, Roch(r), Rogeston, Rosebush, Rosemarket, Rudbaxton

S
 Sageston(r), Sandy Haven, Saundersfoot, Sardis (Saundersfoot community), Sardis (Burton community), Scleddau, Simpson Cross, Slebech, Solva, South Dairy, Spittal, Square And Compass, St Brides, St David's, St Dogmaels, St Dogwells, St Edrins, St Elvis, St Florence, St Ishmael's, St Issells(r), St Nicholas, St Petrox, St Twynnells, Stackpole(r), Stackpole Estate,  Star, Stepaside, Steynton, Summerhill

T
Talbenny, Tavernspite, Tegryn, Templeton, Tenby, Thomas Chapel, Thornton, Tiers Cross, Trecadwgan, Trecwn, Trefasser, Treffgarne, Treffgarn Owen, Treffynnon, Trefin, Tremaenhir, Tremarchog, Troopers Inn, Tufton

U
Upton, Uzmaston

V
Vorlan

W
Wallis(r), Walton East, Walton West, Walwyn's Castle, Warren, Waterston, West Williamston(r), Whitchurch, Whitehill(r), Whitechurch, Wisemans Bridge, Wiston, Withybush(r), Wood, Wooden, Woodstock, Wind Mill Hill, Wolf's Castle, Wolfsdale(r)

Y
Yerbeston(r)

See also
List of places in Pembrokeshire (categorised)
List of United Kingdom locations

References

Pembrokeshire